The Governor of Novosibirsk Oblast (Gubernator Novosibirskoy oblasti) is the chief executive (defined by the local Charter as "the supreme public officer") of Novosibirsk Oblast, Russia. According to the regional law, the Governor, being "at the head of the supreme executive state body of Novosibirsk Oblast" holds the official title of the Chair of the Oblast Government.

The current Governor is Andrey Travnikov, representing "United Russia" party. He was nominated by President Vladimir Putin on 6 October 2017, replacing Vladimir Gorodetsky.

List

Elections
The latest election for the office was held on 9 September 2018

References 

 
Politics of Novosibirsk Oblast
Novosibirsk